Colt Island is the closest and smallest of three low-lying, uninhabited islands off the headland of Skerries, Fingal, County Dublin in Ireland.

Toponymy
The origin of the original, Irish, name is unknown although it has been proposed to be related to a food source. The anglicised version of the name cannot be a translation as the Irish word for a colt is bromach.

Environment 
It is an island of low cliffs and lies about 0.5 km from the mainland, with vegetation consisting of grasses, brambles and other species such as hogweed. Like the other two Skerries Islands, it is important for breeding seabirds and wintering water fowl.

References

External links

Islands of County Dublin
Uninhabited islands of Ireland